Wing Priory also Wenge Priory was a medieval monastic house in Buckinghamshire, England.

References

Monasteries in Buckinghamshire